Reminiscing is a compilation album by American singer-songwriter Buddy Holly. The album was released as an LP record in both mono and stereo formats in February 1963 (see 1963 in music). Reminiscing was Buddy Holly's third posthumously released album and the second album to feature previously unreleased material. The original recordings were overdubbed by the Fireballs in 1962 and many of the undubbed recordings appeared on For the First Time Anywhere in 1983.

Track listing
Original album

1999 Bonus tracks

Personnel
The following people contributed to Reminiscing:
Buddy Holly – lead vocals, guitar
Jerry Allison – drums
Sonny Curtis – guitar
Don Guess – bass
Larry Welborn – bass
Joe B. Mauldin – bass
George Tomsco – overdubbed guitar
Keith McCormack – overdubbed rhythm guitar
Stan Lark – overdubbed bass
Lyn Baily – overdubbed bass
Doug Roberts – overdubbed drums
King Curtis – tenor saxophone on "Reminiscing"
Norman Petty – producer

Charts

Album

Release history

References

External links

Buddy Holly compilation albums
1963 compilation albums
Compilation albums published posthumously
Coral Records compilation albums
Albums produced by Norman Petty